The Chickamauga Cherokee refers to a group that separated from the greater body of the Cherokee during the American Revolutionary War.  The majority of the Cherokee people wished to make peace with the Americans near the end of 1776, following several military setbacks and American reprisals.  

The followers of the skiagusta (or red chief), Dragging Canoe, moved with him in the winter of 1776–77 down the Tennessee River away from their historic Overhill Cherokee towns.  Relocated in a more isolated area, they established 11 new towns in order to gain distance from colonists' encroachments. The frontier Americans associated Dragging Canoe and his band with their new town on Chickamauga Creek and began to refer to them as the Chickamaugas.  Five years later, the Chickamauga moved further west and southwest into present-day Alabama, establishing five larger settlements.  They were then more commonly known as the Lower Cherokee. This term was closely associated with the people of these "Five Lower Towns".

Migration

"Chickamauga" towns

During the winter of 1776–77, Cherokee followers of Dragging Canoe, who had supported the British at the outbreak of the American Revolutionary War, moved down the Tennessee River and away from their historic Overhill Cherokee towns. They established nearly a dozen new towns in this frontier area in an attempt to gain distance from encroaching European-American settlers.

Dragging Canoe and his followers settled at the place where the Great Indian Warpath crossed the Chickamauga Creek, near present-day Chattanooga, Tennessee. They named their town Chickamauga after the stream. The entire adjacent region was referred to in general as the Chickamauga area. American settlers adopted that term to refer to the militant Cherokee in this area as "Chickamaugas."

In 1782, militia forces under John Sevier and William Campbell destroyed the eleven Cherokee towns.  Dragging Canoe led his people further down the Tennessee River, establishing five new, Lower Cherokee towns.

After the Revolutionary War, westward migration increased by pioneers from the new states of Virginia, North Carolina, South Carolina, and Georgia.

"Five Lower Towns"

Dragging Canoe relocated his people west and southwest, into new settlements in Georgia centered on Running Water (now Whiteside) on Running Water Creek. The other towns founded at this time were: Nickajack (near the cave of the same name), Long Island (on the Tennessee River), Crow Town (at the mouth of Crow Creek), and Lookout Mountain Town (at the site of the current Trenton, Georgia).  In time more towns developed to the south and west, and all these were referred to as the Lower Towns.

Constant war

The Chickamauga Cherokee became known for their uncompromising enmity against United States (US) settlers, who had pushed them out of their traditional territory. From Running Water town, Dragging Canoe led attacks on white settlements all over the American Southeast.

The Chickamauga/Lower Cherokee and the frontiersmen were continuously at war until 1794.  Chickamauga warriors raided as far as Indiana, Kentucky, and Virginia (along with members of the Northwestern Confederacy—which they helped establish). Because of a growing belief in the Chickamauga cause, as well as the US destruction of homes of other Native Americans, a majority of the Cherokee eventually came to be allied against the United States.

Following the death of Dragging Canoe in 1792, his hand-picked successor, John Watts, assumed control of the Lower Cherokee. Under Watts's lead, the Cherokee continued their policy of Indian unity and hostility toward European Americans. Watts moved his base of operations to Willstown to be closer to his Muscogee allies. Before this, he had concluded a treaty in Pensacola with the Spanish governor of West Florida, Arturo O'Neill de Tyrone, for arms and supplies with which to carry on the war.

Cherokee interactions
The Chickamauga Towns and the later Lower Towns were no different from the rest of the Cherokee than were other groups of historic settlements, known as the Middle Towns, Out Towns, (original) Lower Towns, Valley Towns, or Overhill Towns, which well established on the east and western sides of the Appalachian Mountains by the time the Europeans first encountered these people. The groupings did not constitute separate political entities, as much as indicate geographic groupings. People of the Overhill and Valley towns did speak a similar dialect. The highly decentralized people based their governments in the clan and larger town, where townhouses were built for communal gatherings. Some of the towns were associated with nearby, smaller villages. Although there were regional councils, these had no binding powers.

Over time, the different groups of towns developed differing ideas about relations with European-Americans. In part this was based on the degree of interaction and intermarriage they had with them through trading and other partnerships.

The only "national" role which existed among Cherokee people before 1788 was that of First Beloved Man, a chief negotiator from the Towns of the Cherokee most isolated from the reach of European settlers.  After 1788, the people established a national council of sorts, but it met irregularly and at the time had little authority.  Even after the peace of 1794, the Cherokee had five groups: the Upper Towns (formerly the Lower Towns of western Carolina and northeastern Georgia), the Overhill Towns, the Hill Towns, the Valley Towns, and the (new) Lower Towns, each with their own regional ruling councils (considered more important than the "national" council at Ustanali in Georgia).

Dragging Canoe had addressed the National Council at Ustanali, and publicly acknowledged Little Turkey as the senior leader of all the Cherokee. He was memorialized by the council following his death in 1792. Leaders of the "Chickamauga" frequently communicated with the Cherokee of other regions. They were supported in warfare against the colonists and later pioneers by warriors from the Overhill Towns. Numerous Chickamauga headmen signed treaties with the federal government, along with other leaders of Cherokee Nation.

Aftermath of the wars
Following the Treaty of Tellico Blockhouse in late 1794, leaders from the Lower Cherokee dominated national affairs of the people.  When the national government of all the Cherokee Nation was organized, the first three persons to hold the office of Principal Chief of the Cherokee Nation were: Little Turkey (1788–1801), Black Fox (1801–1811), and Pathkiller (1811–1827). These men had all served as warriors under Dragging Canoe. Doublehead and Turtle-at-Home, the first two Speakers of the Cherokee National Council, had also served with Dragging Canoe.

The domination of the Cherokee Nation by the former warriors from the Lower Towns continued well into the 19th century.  Even after the revolt of the young chiefs of the Upper Towns, the representatives of the Lower Towns were a major voice. The "young chiefs" of the Upper Towns who dominated that region had also previously been warriors with Dragging Canoe and Watts.

Resettling 
Many of the former warriors returned to the original settlements in the Chickamauga area, some of which had already been reoccupied. They also established new towns in the area, plus several in north Georgia. Others moved into those towns established after the earlier migration.

In 1799, Brother Steiner, a representative of the Moravian Brethren, met with Richard Fields (Lower Cherokee) at Tellico Blockhouse. Fields had previously served as a warrior. Steiner hired him as guide and interpreter, as the missionary had been sent south by the Brethren to scout for an appropriate location for a mission and school in the Nation. It was ultimately located at Spring Place, on land donated by James Vann, who supported gaining some European-American education for his people.  On one occasion, Steiner asked his guide, "What kind of people are the Chickamauga?"  Fields laughed, then replied, "They are Cherokee, and we know no difference." Neither the Chickamauga nor other Cherokee considered them to be distinct from the overall 18th-century Cherokee peoples.

Still others joined the remnant populations from the former Overhill towns on the Little Tennessee River that were referred to as the Upper Towns. These were centered on Ustanali in Georgia. Vann and his protégés The Ridge and Charles R. Hicks rose to be their top leaders.  The leaders of these towns were the most progressive among the Cherokee, favoring extensive acculturation, formal education adapted from European Americans, and modern methods of farming.

For a decade or more after the end of the hostilities, the northern section of the Upper Towns had their own council and acknowledged the top headman of the Overhill Towns as their leader. They gradually had to move south because they ceded their land to the United States.

John McDonald returned to his old home on the Chickamauga River, across from Old Chickamauga Town, and lived there until selling it in 1816. It was purchased by the Boston-based American Board of Commissioners for Foreign Missions for use as the Brainerd Mission, which served as both a church (named the Baptist Church of Christ at Chickamauga) and a school offering academic and vocational training.  His daughter, Mollie McDonald, and son-in-law, Daniel Ross, developed a farm and trading post near the old village of Chatanuga (Tsatanugi) from the early days of the wars. Settled near them were sons Lewis and Andrew Ross and a number of daughters. Their son John Ross, born at Turkey Town, later rose to become a principal chief, guiding the Cherokee through the Indian Removals of the 1830s and relocation to Indian Territory west of the Mississippi River.

The majority of the Lower Cherokee remained in the towns they inhabited in 1794, known as the Lower Towns, with their seat at Willstown. The former warriors of the Lower Towns dominated the political affairs of the Nation for the next twenty years. They were more conservative than leaders of the Upper Towns, adopting many elements of assimilation but  keeping as many of the old ways as possible.

Roughly speaking, the Lower Towns were south and southwest of the Hiwassee River along the Tennessee down to the north border of the Muscogee nation, and west of the Conasauga and the Ustanali in Georgia, while the Upper Towns were north and east of the Hiwassee and between the Chattahoochee River and the Conasauga.  This latter was approximately the same area as the later Amohee, Chickamauga, and Chattooga districts of the Cherokee Nation East.

Also traditional were the settlements of the Cherokee in the highlands of western North Carolina, which had become known as the Hill Towns, with their seat at Quallatown. Similarly, the lowland Valley Towns, with their seat at Tuskquitee, were more traditional, as was the Upper Town of Etowah. It was notable both for being inhabited mostly by full-bloods (as many Cherokee of the other towns were of mixed race but identified as Cherokee) and for being the largest town in the Cherokee Nation.  The Overhill towns remaining along the Little Tennessee remained more or less autonomous, and kept their seat at Chota.

All five regions had their own councils. These were more important to their people than the nominal nation council until the reorganization in 1810, which took place after the national council held that year at Willstown.

Peacetime leaders of the Lower Towns
John Watts remained the head of the council of the Lower Cherokee at Willstown until his death in 1802.  Afterward, Doublehead, already a member of the triumvirate, moved into that position and held it until his death in 1807. He was assassinated by The Ridge, Alexander Saunders (best friend to James Vann), and John Rogers. The latter was a white former trader who had first come west with Dragging Canoe in 1777. By 1802 he was considered a member of the nation, and was allowed to sit on the council. He was succeeded on the council by The Glass, who was also assistant principal chief of the nation to Black Fox. The Glass was head of the Lower Towns' council until the unification council of 1810.

By the time John Norton (a Mohawk of Cherokee and Scottish ancestry) visited the area in 1809–1810, many of the formerly militant Cherokee of the Lower Towns were among the most assimilated members. James Vann, for instance, became a major planter, holding more than 100 African-American slaves, and was one of the wealthiest men east of the Mississippi.  Norton became a personal friend of Turtle-at-Home as well as John Walker, Jr., and The Glass, all of whom were involved in business and commerce.  At the time of Norton's visit, Turtle-at-Home owned a ferry with a landing on the Federal Road between Nashville, Tennessee and Athens, Georgia, where he lived at Nickajack. This community had expanded down the Tennessee as well as across it to the north, eclipsing Running Water.

When Georgia and the US government increased pressure for the Cherokee Nation to cede its lands and remove to the west of the Mississippi River, such leaders of the Lower Towns as Tahlonteeskee, Degadoga, John Jolly, Richard Fields, John Brown, Bob McLemore, John Rogers, Young Dragging Canoe, George Guess (Tsiskwaya, or Sequoyah) and Tatsi (aka Captain Dutch) were forerunners. Believing that removal was inevitable in the face of settlers' greed, they wanted to try to get the best lands and settlements possible. They moved with followers to Arkansas Territory, establishing what later became known as the Cherokee Nation West. They next moved to Indian Territory following an 1828 treaty between their leaders and the US government. They were called the "Old Settlers" in Indian Territory and lived there nearly a decade before the remainder of the Cherokee were forced to join them.

Likewise, the remaining leaders of the Lower Towns proved to be the strongest advocates of voluntary westward emigration, in which they were most bitterly opposed by those former warriors and their sons who led the Upper Towns.  Ultimately such leaders as Major Ridge (as The Ridge had been known since his military service during the Creek and First Seminole Wars), his son John Ridge, his nephews Elias Boudinot and Stand Watie, came to believe that they needed to try to negotiate the best deal with the federal government, as they believed that removal would happen. Other emigration advocates were John Walker, Jr., David Vann, and Andrew Ross (brother of then Principal Chief John Ross). They agreed to the Treaty of New Echota in 1835, which resulted in the Cherokee removal in 1838–1839.

Later events

Tecumseh's return
In November 1811, Shawnee chief Tecumseh returned to the South hoping to gain the support of the southern tribes for his crusade to drive back the Americans and revive the old ways.  He was accompanied by representatives from the Shawnee, Muscogee, Kickapoo, and Sioux peoples.  Tecumseh's exhortations in the towns of the Chickasaw, Choctaw, and Lower Muscogee found no traction. He did attract some support from  younger warriors of the Upper Muscogee.

The Cherokee delegation under The Ridge who visited Tecumseh's council at Tuckabatchee strongly opposed his plans; Tecumseh cancelled his visit to the Cherokee Nation, as The Ridge threatened him with death if he went there. But, during his recruiting tour, Tecumseh was accompanied by an enthusiastic escort of 47 Cherokee and 19 Choctaw, who presumably went north with him when he returned to the "Northwest Territory."

War with the Creek

Tecumseh's mission sparked a religious revival, referred to by anthropologist James Mooney as the "Cherokee Ghost Dance" movement. It was led by the prophet Tsali of Coosawatee, a former Chickamauga warrior. He later moved to the western North Carolina mountains, where he was executed by U.S. forces in 1838 for violently resisting Removal.

Tsali met with the national council at Ustanali, arguing for war against the Americans. He moved some leaders, until The Ridge spoke even more eloquently in rebuttal, calling instead for support of the Americans in the coming war with the British and Tecumseh's alliance. During the War of 1812, William McIntosh of the Lower Muscogee sought Cherokee help in the Creek War, to suppress the "Red Sticks" (Upper Muscogee). More than 500 Cherokee warriors served under Andrew Jackson in this effort, going against their former allies.

A few years later, Major Ridge led a troop of Cherokee cavalry who were attached to the 1,400-strong contingent of Lower Muscogee warriors under McIntosh in the First Seminole War in Florida. They were allied with and accompanied a force of U.S. regular Army, Georgia militia, and Tennessee volunteers into Florida for action against the Seminoles, refugee Red Sticks, and escaped slaves fighting against the United States.

Warriors from the Cherokee Nation East traveled to the lands of the Old Settlers (or Cherokee Nation West) in Arkansas Territory to assist them during the Cherokee-Osage War of 1817–1823, in which they fought against the Osage. Following the Seminole War, Cherokee warriors, with only one exception, did not take to the warpath in the Southeast again until the time of the American Civil War, when William Holland Thomas raised the Thomas Legion of Cherokee Indians and Highlanders in North Carolina to fight for the Confederacy.

In 1830 the State of Georgia seized land in its south that had belonged to the Cherokee since the end of the Creek War, land separated from the rest of the Cherokee Nation by a large section of Georgia territory, and began to parcel it out to settlers.  Major Ridge led a party of 30 south, where they drove the settlers out of their homes on what the Cherokee considered their land, and burned all buildings to the ground, but harmed no one.

References

Further reading
 The Bloody Ground: The Chickamauga Wars and Trans–Appalachian Expansion, 1776-1794; Kane, Sean Patrick; retrieved July 2021; PDF format/download.

External links
 http://www.cherokee.org

 
18th century Cherokee history
19th century Cherokee history
Native American history of North Carolina
Native American history of Tennessee
State of Franklin
Ethnic groups in Appalachia
Cherokee Nation (1794–1907)